Vikas Verma (born 24 September 1987) is an Indian actor and model in Bollywood. His notable works include Raabta (2017), Mom (2017 film), Judwaa 2 (2017) and Coolie No. 1 (2020). Verma began his career as a model where he won the title of India's Fashion Star 2009, Zoom TV and has walked for leading fashion designers at various fashion weeks. He made his acting debut with a negative role in the romance adventure film Yaariyan. He went on to star in the romantic-comedy film Shaandaar where he played the role of Robin Fundwani. Before his debut in Bollywood he was seen in TV serial Jhansi Ki Rani where he played the negative role as "Marshall and Captain Robert Hamilton". For this role he has won the nomination for "Best Male Negative Lead" at the Indian Telly Awards.

Career
Vikas started his career as a Model in 2009 where he won the title of India's Fashion Star 2009, Zoom TV. He has walked for almost every top-notch designers in the industry at various fashion weeks. He made his acting debut in 2009 with the TV Serial Jhansi Ki Rani where he played the negative role as "Marshall and Captain Robert Hamilton". For this role he has won the nomination for "Best Male Negative Lead" at the Indian Telly Awards. In 2013, he was seen in promotional video song "Pyaar ki Pungi" of Agent Vinod with Saif Ali Khan. In 2014 Vikas made his big-screen debut in the romance adventure film Yaariyan directed by Divya Khosla Kumar, playing the character of Mike. In the same year, he was seen in the Punjabi movie Kirpaan: The Sword of Honour as a negative lead where he plays the role of a British cop.

In 2015, Vikas appeared in the romantic comedy film Shaandaar, directed by Vikas Bahl and produced by Anurag Kashyap and Vikramaditya Motwane, as one of the lead character. He played the role of Robin Fundwani. After Shaandaar he appeared in a music video of Nooran Sisters titled 'Mai Yaar Da Deewana' which was loved by audiences all over India. Vikas did a special guest appearance in the film Raabta where he played the role of Kriti Sanon's ex-boyfriend Maanav. Vikas was seen in film Mom sharing the screen space with legendary actors like Sridevi, Nawazuddin Siddiqui and Judwaa 2 alongside Varun Dhawan, Jacqueline Fernandez and Taapsee Pannu

TV advertisement
Vikas has done commercials for various brands like Rupa Hunk, Quickr, Set Wet Deo, Kit Kat and many more. He was also the face for brands like Bare Denim, Adams, Mc Dowel Diet Whiskey, JW Marriot Arola and much more.

Filmography

Films

Television

Web series

References

1987 births
Living people
21st-century Indian male actors
Indian male models
Male actors from Rajasthan